Barbara van Beck (16 February 1629  1668?) was an entrepreneur and celebrity who lived with a condition whereby her face and much of her body were covered with hair.

Early life
Barbara Ursler was born in Augsburg, Germany, in 1629. Her parents were Anne and Balthazar Ursler. The Urslers exhibited her at shows, but also educated their daughter. She later married Johan Michael van Beck and became Barbara van Beck. The couple had one child and her husband became her manager. He reportedly married her for the purposes of making money through his wife's appearance in shows.

Public appearances
Barbara van Beck became internationally renowned and travelled Europe, appearing in shows. In 1655, van Beck travelled to London for the first time. In 1657, John Evelyn recorded seeing her at a show with other notable performers of the period. He wrote that she "played well on the harpsichord." Evelyn's friend Samuel Pepys described having seen a woman with a similar condition in subsequent diaries, and there is debate over whether this is the same individual.

Barbara van Beck made a public appearance in Beauvais in 1660. An etching of her portrait by Richard Gaywood was used to advertise this show, and a copy was sent to local authorities to obtain permission for the show. By this point, van Beck was already becoming a celebrity: her request to appear notes that she had already received attention in Paris (where she had appeared in 1645) and other French cities.

In 1668, van Beck appeared in London and was seen by Holger Jacobsen who wrote about her for Thomas Bartholin's book Acta Medica et Philosophica Hafnensis. He was struck by the length and softness of her hair, and reported examining her genitals to see whether they resembled those of a monkey. After 1668, there are no mentions of van Beck, and some have speculated that she may have died in this year.

Condition
Barbara van Beck is believed to have had the condition hypertrichosis, also called Ambras syndrome.

Depictions

Engravings of van Beck were made by several engravers. H. Winze presented her standing, full-length in 1638. Isaac Brunnin depicted her in 1653 and Richard Gaywood showed her with her left hand on an organ with information about her birth and personal life. Engraver William Richardson created an engraving of her playing a harpsichord.

A 1640s portrait of van Beck depicts her "wearing an expensive silk gown, with a fashionable, low neckline". Historian Angela McShane observed that "this is a beautifully executed high-status painting", and highlights that depictions of van Beck differ from later Victorian images of "freaks".

References

Year of death unknown
1629 births
People with hypertrichosis
17th-century German women
17th-century German musicians
17th-century German businesspeople